Port Washington is the terminus of the Long Island Rail Road's Port Washington Branch in Port Washington, New York. The station is located on Main Street, between Haven Avenue and South Bayles Avenue, just west of Port Washington Boulevard (NY 101), and is 19.9 miles (32 km) from Pennsylvania Station in Midtown Manhattan. A pedestrian bridge exists between the platforms, and is in line with Franklin Avenue, ending at Haven Avenue.

History
A Port Washington station was recommended to Austin Corbin by a group of Port Washington residents in 1895, after a failed attempt to extend the branch between Great Neck and Roslyn in 1882. Efforts to bring rail service to the community actually date back to the days of the Flushing and North Side Railroad which established an unbuilt subsidiary called the "North Shore and Port Washington Railroad" that was dissolved once the F&NS was consolidated into the Flushing, North Shore and Central Railroad in 1874. The station was originally built on June 23, 1898 by the Great Neck and Port Washington Railroad, an LIRR subsidiary that existed between 1898 and 1902. It was electrified in 1913, and remodeled in 1930, and again in 1998 upon the station's 100th Anniversary.

Station layout

This station has two 10-car long island platforms serving four tracks. The remaining tracks make up the Port Washington Yard and are used for train storage. In order to allow for increased service via the line to Grand Central Terminal once East Side Access is completed, two existing tracks in the yard will be extended to accommodate two additional ten-car trains. Work began in January 2018, and was scheduled to be completed by December 2020.

References

External links
 

Unofficial LIRR History Website Photos
July 1999 Photo
December 2006 Photos
Tracks 4 & 3 and  Station House from the end of the platforms
Station House and Bicycle Racks near the  Historic Port Washington Directory
Franklin Avenue pedestrian bridge over storage tracks
View of Willowdale Avenue Bridge
Station view from Pedestrian Bridges between Platforms
Port Washington Yard Reconfiguration (The LIRR Today)
Station House from Google Maps Street View
Platforms from Google Maps Street View
Waiting Room from Google Maps Street View

Long Island Rail Road stations in Nassau County, New York
Railway stations in the United States opened in 1898